The 1966–67 La Liga was the 36th season since its establishment. The season started on September 10, 1966, and finished on April 23, 1967.

Team locations

League table

Results

Relegation play-offs 

|}

Pichichi Trophy

External links 
  Official LFP Site

1966 1967
1966–67 in Spanish football leagues
Spain